Hans Børli (8 December 1918 – 26 August 1989) was a Norwegian poet and writer, who besides his writings worked as a lumberjack all his life.

Biography
Hans Georg Nilsen Børli  was born at  Eidskog in Hedmark, Norway. He was the fifth of seven children born to Nils Thorkildsen Børli (1883–1951) and Marie Bolette Olsdatter Børli (1881–1962). Børli was raised on a small farm in a road-less area in the forests of Eidskog Kommune. The experience of poverty and hardship would leave a deep imprint on his later art. However, the positive effects of living close to nature, the wisdom of tradition and the solidarity between workers also had a significant bearing on his writings.   A strict Christian pietism upbringing would leave Børli forever struggling with the counteractive forces of rebellion and a deeply embedded sense of religious  longing.

Børli was considered a gifted boy and was admitted to Talhaug Mercantile School  in Kongsvinger. He later was admitted to a military academy in Oslo, but his education was ended by the outbreak of the Second World War. Børli fought against the invading German Army, was involved in some intense battles in Vardal, and was captured in Verdal. After being released, he went back to Eidskog and worked as a teacher and forest worker for the remaining of the war. During the Occupation of Norway by Nazi Germany, he was also involved in illegal activities including guiding refugees across the Swedish border.

His first collection of poetry, Tyrield  was published in 1945. Until the mid-1950s, he published books almost annually, both poetry and prose. His writings were a characteristic blend of traditional and free form, romance and realism, perversion, seriousness, social awareness and religious quest. Ole Gundersen Børli (1860–1945), his mother's father was considered one of the last great oral narrator of legends and stories of the area. He was considered an important influence on the young writer-to-be. Hans Børli was by his own account also heavily influenced by the writings of poet Olav H. Hauge (1908-1994).

Publications

Poetry
Years link to corresponding "[year] in poetry" articles:

1945: Tyrielden ("Pine Passion")
1948: Villfugl ("Wild Bird")
1949: Men støtt kom nye vårer ("But Spring Would Always Come")
1952: Likevel må du leve ("Still There is Life")
1954: Ser jeg en blomme i skogen ("When I See a Flower in the Forest")
1957: Kont-Jo ("Timber Joe")
21/10-1958:Dagene ("Days")
1960: Jeg ville fange en fugl ("I Wanted to Catch a Bird")
1962: Ved bålet ("By Campfire")
1964: Hver liten ting ("Every Little Thing")
1966: Brønnen utenfor Nachors stad ("The Well by Nachor")
1968: Når menneskene er gått heim ("When Humans Have Gone Home")
1978: Dag og drøm ("Day and Dream")
1969: Som rop ved elver ("Like Roars by Rivers")
1970: Isfuglen ("The Ice Bird")
1972: Kyndelsmesse ("Candlemas")
1974: Vindharpe ("Wind Harp")
1976: Vinden ser aldri på veiviserne ("The Wind Never Beholds the Pathfinder")
1979: Når kvelden står rød over Hesteknatten ("Evening Red over the Horse Hummock")
1984: Frosne tranebær ("Frozen Cranberries")

Prose
Years link to corresponding "[year] in literature" articles:
 1946: Han som valte skogen ("He Who Chose the Forest"), novel
 1949: Det small et skott ("A Shot was Heard"), novel
 1951: Sølv og stål ("Silver and Steel")
 1953: Under lomskriket ("The Cry of the Loon"),
 1987: Tusseleiken (fortellinger og skisser)
 1988: Med øks og lyre. Blar av en tømmerhuggers dagbok ("With Axe and Lyre. Pages from the Diary of a Lumberjack"), autobiography
 1991: Smykket fra slagmarken ("Gem from a Battlefield"),  novel

Other
About Hans Børli:

1998: Syng liv i ditt liv. En biografi. ("Sing Life in Your Life.- A Biography.")

In translation:

We Own the Forests: And Other Poems, sixty of Børli's poems in a parallel Norwegian-English edition, translated by Louis Muinzer
Cesta lesy, 43 of Børli's poems in a parallel Norwegian-Czech edition, translated by Petr Uhlíř

Prizes and recognition 
1970 : Norwegian Critics Prize for Literature
1971 : Nominated for the Nordic Council's Literature Prize for the poetry collection Isfuglen
1972 : Dobloug Prize
1974 : Mads Wiel Nygaard's Endowment
1982 : Fritt Ord Honorary Award.

References

External links 
The Norwegian Hans Børli Society (in Norwegian)

1918 births
1989 deaths
People from Eidskog
20th-century Norwegian novelists
20th-century Norwegian poets
Norwegian male novelists
20th-century Norwegian male writers
Norwegian male poets
Norwegian Critics Prize for Literature winners
Dobloug Prize winners